Ondřej Brejcha (born 3 May 1994) is a Czech footballer who plays as a midfielder for Regionalliga club VfB Auerbach.

References

External links
 

Czech footballers
1994 births
Living people
Association football midfielders
Czech First League players
FC Sellier & Bellot Vlašim players
FK Dukla Prague players
Czech National Football League players
Bohemian Football League players
FK Slavoj Vyšehrad players
SK Benešov players
VfB Auerbach players
Regionalliga players
Czech expatriate footballers
Expatriate footballers in Germany
Czech expatriate sportspeople in Germany